is a Japanese manga series written and produced by Kentaro Miura and illustrated by his personal manga studio, Studio Gaga. Inspired by the aesthetic of ancient Greek and Mesopotamian myths, the story follows an androgynous protagonist named Usumgal (which means 'Dragon') who lives in a mythological world. It was serialized in Hakusensha's seinen manga magazine Young Animal Zero from September 2019 to May 2020. The publisher decided to finish the series following Miura's death in May 2021. Its chapters were collected in a single volume, released in December 2021.

Production

The announcement received negative attention from fans of Miura's Berserk series, worrying that this new manga will only distract and further delay Berserk. In response, Miura gave an interview where he clarified that his involvement in Duranki would be relatively minimal and not impede the progress of Berserk. Based on suggestions from Hakusensha, Miura served as the "director" of the project, drawing the storyboards and rough copies for each installment while his assistants at Studio Gaga do the majority of the work, including the inking. Based on the success of strong female characters in works like Frozen and Mad Max: Fury Road, Miura saw an androgynous lead character as the next step and decided to "throw a stone at it" with this story.

Miura died of aortic dissection on May 6, 2021. In September of the same year, Hakusensha announced that the manga had ended, after consideration and discussions between the editors and Studio Gaga.

Publication
Duranki debuted in the inaugural issue of Hakusensha's Young Animal Zero, with its first two chapters published on September 9, 2019.<ref></p><p></ref> Its third chapter was published on November 9, 2019; the fourth chapter was published on January 9, 2020; the fifth chapter was published on March 9, 2020; the sixth and last chapter was published on May 9, 2020. Miura died on May 6, 2021, and the publisher announced in September of the same year that they decided to finish the series. The posthumous collected volume, which included unpublished design materials, was released on December 24, 2021.

Chapter list

Notes

References

External links
 Duranki official website at Young Animal 
 

2020 comics endings
Fantasy anime and manga
Hakusensha manga
Seinen manga
Unfinished comics